Birth of Jazz is a 1932 short animated film by Columbia Pictures, featuring Krazy Kat.

Plot
The cartoon opens with an animated Earth sleeping in a snoring fashion. It then moves to a cat trying to enter a house's front yard only to be shooed away by a resident dog. The scene once more moves to a house where the ghost of Hungarian composer Franz Liszt rises from a bust, and plays Hungarian Rhapsody No. 2 on a piano.

Moments later, a flock of storks are flying across the night sky, carrying infants in sacks. One of them gets hit by lightning and therefore drops a sack. The sack falls into a house where it opens. The baby that comes out is none other than Krazy Kat in diapers. Despite being so young, the kitten has a knack for making music, especially in the jazz genre. As he plays Down Home Rag with one instrument and another, the others come to life and play along.

After spending time playing in the house, the young Krazy and the instruments take to the skies in an airplane. They then play Saint Louis Blues around the globe, and those who hear it dance to the rhythm. People who enjoyed their performance include: a man and a bull in a bullfight, Russian hooligans, Dutch clowns, and an African tribe. In no time, the animated Earth is awake and in an upbeat mood. Finally, Krazy and the instruments are parading on the street with thousands of spectators watching. When they reach the end of their march, a man in a tophat approaches and awards Krazy the key to a particular city.

See also
 Krazy Kat filmography

References

External links
Birth of Jazz at the Big Cartoon Database
 

1932 films
1932 animated films
1932 short films
1930s ghost films
1930s American animated films
1930s animated short films
American animated short films
American black-and-white films
Krazy Kat shorts
Columbia Pictures short films
Jazz films
Columbia Pictures animated short films
Cultural depictions of Franz Liszt
Screen Gems short films